Fyodor Vasilyevich Marulin (born 1 June 1926) was a Soviet middle-distance runner. He competed in the men's 3000 metres steeplechase at the 1952 Summer Olympics.

References

External links
 

1926 births
Possibly living people
Athletes (track and field) at the 1952 Summer Olympics
Soviet male middle-distance runners
Soviet male steeplechase runners
Olympic athletes of the Soviet Union
Place of birth missing